William Lane (fl. 1571) was an English politician.

He was a Member (MP) of the Parliament of England for Northampton in 1571. He was a son of Ralph and Maud Lane.

References

Year of birth missing
Year of death missing
English MPs 1571